Two for the Show is a 1994 album by David Friesen.

Track listing
 "Airegin" - (04:56) Friesen / Michael Brecker
 "True Blue" - (07:48) Friesen / John Scofield
 "I Want To Be Happy" - (02:55) Friesen / Clark Terry
 "In Times Past" - (07:12) Friesen / Denny Zeitlin
 "Alone Together" - (04:46) Friesen / Bud Shank
 "On The Road With Jazz" - (04:53) Friesen / Uwe Kropinski
 "Signs And Wonders" - (06:04) Friesen / Michael Brecker
 "Old Folks" - (06:15) Friesen / John Scofield
 "Breeze" - (05:18) Friesen / Clark Terry
 "Maybe In Spring" - (07:46) Friesen / Denny Zeitlin
 "Double Take" - (03:14) Friesen / Bud Shank
 "Pianola" - (04:10) Friesen / Uwe Kropinski

References

1994 albums